Kurifuji (also known as Toshifuji) was an undefeated Thoroughbred racemare, whose three classic wins included the Tokyo Yūshun race or Japanese Derby.

She was a chestnut mare that was bred at the Shimofusa Stud in Japan. Kurifuji was by the five times leading sire, Tournesol (GB), her dam Kenfuji was by the imported sire, Chapel Brampton (GB). She was a sister to three other horses including Happy Might who won the Tenno Sho, autumn race over 3,200 metres.

Racing record

In 1943 Kurifuji was only the second filly to win the Japanese Derby after Hisatomo had done so in 1937. This race attracts top quality horses and many Japanese champions have won it including Deep Impact, Narita Brian, Shinzan and Symboli Rudolf.  Kurifuji also won the 1943 Yushun Himba (Japanese Oaks) and 1943 Kikuka Shō (Japanese St. Leger). Racing in Japan she had a total of 11 starts for 11 wins.

Stud record
Known as Kurifuji during her racing career, she was then known as Toshifuji as a broodmare. Her progeny won 55 races and included:
1946 colt, Tohanofuji, by Shian Mor, won 15 races
1949 colt, Theft Y by Theft (IRE), won 8 races 
1950 filly, Ichijo by Theft (IRE), won 7 races
1951 filly, Yamaichi by Toshishiro, won 5 races including the Yushun Himba and Oka Sho (Japanese 1,000 Guineas) etc.
1953 colt, Homaremon by Greylord won 5 races
1954 colt, Fuji-O by Greylord won 6 races
1958 filly, Mejirofuji by Greylord, won 2 races
1961 colt, Sugaya Homare by Turks Reliance, won 7 races.

Kurifuji or Toshifuji as she was then known as, died in 1964.

In 1984 Kurifuji was inducted into the Japan Racing Association Hall of Fame.

Pedigree

See also
List of leading Thoroughbred racehorses

References 

1940 racehorse births
1964 racehorse deaths
Racehorses bred in Japan
Racehorses trained in Japan
Undefeated racehorses
Thoroughbred family 7-c